XX or xx may refer to:

 20 (number), Roman numeral XX

Film and TV
 XX (film), a 2017 anthology horror film
 "XX", an episode of CSI: Crime Scene Investigation (season 4)
XX, the production code for the 1969 Doctor Who serial The Seeds of Death
 XX (web series), a 2020 South Korean web series
 XX (organization), a fictional organisation in the comic and game XIII

Genetics 

XX chromosome, in the XY sex-determination system
 XX male syndrome, also known as de la Chapelle syndrome, a rare congenital intersex condition resulting in a phenotypical male with two X chromosomes
 XX gonadal dysgenesis, a type of female hypogonadism resulting in non-functioning ovaries
 XX chromosome, in the XO sex-determination system

Music
 The xx, a British indie band
 X___X (band), a Cleveland no wave band

Albums
 xx (album), by the xx, 2009
 XX (Mushroomhead album), 2001
 XX (Great Big Sea album), 2012
 XX (O.A.R. album), 2016
 XX (Mino album), 2018
 XX, a 2018 album by Note-oriety
 Toto XX, a 1998 album by Toto 
 XX – Two Decades of Love Metal, a 2012 album by HIM
 + +, an EP by Loona repackaged as [X X] in 2019

Songs
 "xx", a song by Hayley Kiyoko from Expectations
 "XX", a song by Feid from Ferxxo (Vol 1: M.O.R)

Organisations
 XX Bomber Command, an inactive United States Air Force unit
 XX Corps (disambiguation)
 Legio XX Valeria Victrix or Legion XX, a legion of the Roman Empire

Other uses
 XX System or Double-Cross System, a British deception operation in the Second World War
 Les XX, a group of twenty Belgian painters
 Dos Equis or XX, a brand of Mexican beer
 xx, to express exponentiation in the initial version of the FORTRAN programming language
 XX, a novel by Rian Hughes

See also

 20 (disambiguation)
 Double Cross (disambiguation)
 X (disambiguation)
 XXX (disambiguation)
 XXXX (disambiguation)